Charlie Withers (6 September 1922 – 7 June 2005) was a professional footballer who played for Tottenham Hotspur, Boston United and represented the England B team.

Football career 
Withers joined the Spurs as a junior and signed as a professional in October 1947. He played in the position of full back and completed 164 games and scored ten times in all competitions between 1947–55. An integral member of the push and run Championship winning side of 1950–51 when he featured in 39 games. On leaving Spurs, Withers transferred to Boston United.

Honours 
Tottenham Hotspur

Football League First Division Winners: 1950–51

External links 
A-Z of Tottenham Hotspur players

References 
http://www.bufc.drfox.org.uk/rollcall.html List of Boston United players.

1922 births
2005 deaths
Footballers from Edmonton, London
Tottenham Hotspur F.C. players
Boston United F.C. players
English Football League players
English footballers
Association football defenders